Wrzeszczyn  is a village in the administrative district of Gmina Jeżów Sudecki, within Karkonosze County, Lower Silesian Voivodeship, in south-western Poland. 

References

Villages in Karkonosze County